Diego Farias da Silva (born 10 May 1990) is a Brazilian professional footballer who plays as a forward for Italian club Benevento.

Club career
In June 2012, Nocerina excised the rights to sign Sorocaba-born Farias, but Chievo excised the counter-option to keep him in Verona. He signed a new 4+1 contract with club. On 16 July 2012, he joined Calcio Padova on a loan deal for the 2012–13 season.

On 31 January 2019, Farias joined Empoli on loan with an option to buy, after five years at Cagliari.

On 13 August 2019, Farias joined Serie A club Lecce on loan with an option to buy.

On 22 September 2020, Farias joined Spezia on loan until 30 June 2021.

On 2 December 2021, his contract with Cagliari was terminated by mutual consent.

On 14 January 2022, he signed with Benevento in Serie B.

Career statistics

References

External links
 

1990 births
Living people
People from Sorocaba
Association football forwards
Brazilian footballers
Hellas Verona F.C. players
A.S.G. Nocerina players
Calcio Padova players
U.S. Sassuolo Calcio players
Cagliari Calcio players
Empoli F.C. players
U.S. Lecce players
Spezia Calcio players
Campo Grande Atlético Clube players
Benevento Calcio players
Serie A players
Serie B players
Serie C players
Brazilian expatriate footballers
Brazilian expatriate sportspeople in Italy
Expatriate footballers in Italy
Footballers from São Paulo (state)